Jérémie Colot (born 24 January 1986) is a French former competitive figure skater. He won one ISU Junior Grand Prix medal and competed at the 2005 World Junior Championships, placing 11th. After moving up to the senior level, he won three international medals — silver at the 2005 Merano Cup and 2006 Triglav Trophy and bronze at the 2007 International Cup of Nice. He retired from competition around 2008.

Programs

Competitive highlights
GP: Grand Prix; JGP: Junior Grand Prix

References

External links
 

French male single skaters
Living people
1986 births
Sportspeople from Villeneuve-Saint-Georges